Studenica is a peak found in Kosovo near Suva Reka in the Jezerska planina mountains.

It is close to Suva Reka and near Guri i Dollocit (Stone of Dolloce) and Antena of Kabash.

Notes and references

Notes:

References:

Mountains of Kosovo